Muhūrta is a Hindu unit of measurement for time along with nimiṣa, kāṣṭhā, and kalā in the Hindu calendar.

In the Brāhmaṇas, muhūrta denotes a division of time: 1/30 of a day, or a period of 48 minutes. The sense "moment" is also common in the Brāhmanạs.
In the Rigveda we only find the sense "moment".

Each muhūrta is further divided into 30 Kalā, or Indian minutes (1 Kalā = 1.6 western minutes or 96 Western seconds). Each kalā is further divided into 30 Kāṣṭhā, or Indian seconds (1 Kāṣṭhā ≈ 3.2 Western seconds).

Etymology
The "Sandhi Vidchhed" for the term is thus: It breaks muhūrt into two parts, muhu (moment/immediate) and ṛta (order). The Ṛg Ved III.33.5 accordingly mentions this descriptive term. Ṛta refers to the natural, yearly order of the seasons, so muhūrta refers to the daily reflection of these. Also, cf., Śatapatha Brāhmaṇa X.4.2.18, as below.

Annual calibration
The Muhūrtas are traditionally calculated by assuming sunrise at 06:00 AM on the vernal equinox, which is the Vedic New Year. Not all of the constellations cross the zenith, so that it is not in every case clear which constellation presides over the Muhūrta. Yet it is clear that one or more prominent features of the correlate constellations, from which the later Muhūrtas draw their respective names, falls within the celestial longitude of the same, drawn from the polar axis.

Literature
The term appears as early as the Ṛg Veda, where, according to Monier Williams, it means "a moment", but does not evidence any specification of an exact periodicity there as received in later works, such as the  Śatapatha-Brāhmaṇa, "The One Hundred Path Riddle" or the Taittirīya-Brāhmaṇa, "The Partridge's Riddle".

Pt. Vijay Shrikrishna Jakatdar points to two specific Ṛg Veda passages that employ the term, III.33.5, and III.53.8:

and

Taittirīya-Brāhmaṇa mentions the names of 15 muhūrtas as follows:

  saṁjñānaṁ 
  vijñānaṁ 
  prajñānaṁ 
  jānad 
  abhijānat
  saṁkalpamānaṁ 
  prakalpamānam 
  upakalpamānam 
  upakḷptaṁ 
  kḷptam
  śreyo 
  vasīya 
  āyat 
  saṁbhūtaṁ 
  bhūtam |

Śatapatha Brāhmaṇa describes a muhūrta as 1/15th portion of a day:

It is stated in Manusmṛti that 18 nimeṣas ("twinklings of the eye") are 1 kāṣṭhā, 30 kāṣṭhās are 1 kāla, 30 kālas are one muhūrta, and 30 muhūrtas are one day and night.

Significance
It is a common practice in Hinduism to perform or avoid activities like important religious ceremonies on the basis of the quality of a particular Muhūrta. One or more Muhūrtas are recommended by the Vedic scriptures when performing rituals and other ceremonies. This is demonstrated in the way "Muhūrt" is used in present-day South Asia for calculating the most auspicious moment for a Vedic-Hindu Wedding ceremony. Astrologers are often hired to calculate a moment for the wedding so that any possible divinely-sourced problems can be averted. Jakatdar suggests a shift in the contemporary temperament regarding the traditional approach to calculating such events, to accommodate the ever increasing complexity of modern life. The muhūrt has the same utility in the marriage rites in Hinduism.

Another example is the so-called Brahma Muhūrta, which is about one and a half hours before sunrise. This particular time, which is associated with the constellations during the Vernal Equinox, is said to be auspicious for practicing yoga. There is also the case of samayik, which is part of the initiation rite for the Svetambar mendicants or those who pursue a perpetual state of heightened meditative awareness. They take the samayik, a vow for life taken for short periods, preferably one or two muhūrts, where one muhūrt constitutes forty minutes.

Significance
Traditionally, it is common practice amongst Hindus to start or avoid starting significant tasks like religious ceremonies, etc. on the basis of the quality of a particular Muhūrta. The Vedic scriptures also generally recommend one or more Muhūrtas to perform rituals and practices. The most widely known example of this practice:

Brahma Muhūrta, approximately one and a half hours before sunrise or more precisely is 1Hr 36 Mins. i.e. 96 Minutes = 2 Muhūrta or 4 Ghaṭīkā, is recommended in all practices of yoga is traditionally considered most apt for meditation. However, it is clear from the associations of the names with specific constellations that the present Brahma-Muhūrta starts just before 6:00AM during the Vernal Equinox. At present, Jīva-Amṛta and Viṣṇu comprise the two twilight muhūrtas prior to sunrise.

See also
 Electional astrology
 Gudhi Padwa
 Jyotiṣa
 Rāhu-Kālam or Rāhu Kāla

References

Further reading
Dictionary of Hindu Lore and Legend by Anna Dallapiccola

External links

Article on Importance of Muhurta by Shyamasundara Dasa

Hindu astrology
Time measurement systems
Hindu philosophical concepts
Time in Hinduism
Obsolete units of measurement